The Gremnik is one of the largest bauxite mines in Kosovo. The mine is located in Klina in District of Peja. The mine has reserves amounting to 3.66 million tonnes of ore grading 40.49% bauxite.

References

External links
Official website

Bauxite mines in Kosovo